Erik Bergkvist (born 1 May 1965 in Norsjö Municipality) is a Swedish politician for the Social Democratic Party. In 2019, he was voted into the European Parliament.

References

Living people
1965 births
MEPs for Sweden 2019–2024
People from Norsjö Municipality